Besharat (also Romanized as Beshārat) is a village in Qara Bashlu Rural District, Chapeshlu District, Dargaz County, Razavi Khorasan Province, Iran. At the 2006 census, its population was 479, in 91 families.

References 

Populated places in Dargaz County